Sretenović (Cyrillic script: Сретеновић) is a Serbian patronymic surname derived from a masculine given name Sreten. It may refer to:

 Jovana Sretenović (born 1986), football player
 Sreten Sretenović (born 1985), football player
 Zoran Sretenović (born 1964), basketball player and coach

Serbian surnames
Patronymic surnames